Pearl is the annual national cultural fest of BITS Pilani, Hyderabad Campus. Initially introduced in 2009 as an intra-college festival, a year after the foundation of BITS Pilani, Hyderabad, the fest grew into a national level college cultural fest with participation from more than 50 colleges across India with footfall around 8000. Pearl hosts a variety of cultural events and competitions which include music, dance, literary, photography and quizzing. The fest also hosts talks and pro-shows with celebrities and bands of national and international renown appearing and/or performing during the fest in the 9 years since its inception.

History 

The idea of a college fest for BITS-Pilani Hyderabad was initially conceived by its students in the first academic year of the campus, 2008–09. It was named Pearl in reference to the popularity of Hyderabad for its pearls. Initially envisioned as a cultural-cum-technical fest of the campus, the first edition of Pearl was organized in 2009 as a conglomeration of intra-college competitions. The following year, it turned into an inter-college festival with participants from 50 colleges across India attending it. Since inception, the organization of Pearl has been solely the responsibility of the students of BITS-Pilani Hyderabad. For the first four years, i.e. 2009–2012, Pearl consisted of both technical and cultural events. In 2013, however, the technical events were separated and began being organized as the technical fest of the campus, ATMOS.

Over the 9 years since its first edition, the fest grew into one of the biggest fests in the states of Telangana and Andhra Pradesh and a widely known college fest across India. National and international artists and bands including Farhan Akhtar, Grammy-winning Wolfmother, Vishal–Shekhar, Strings, Xandria, and Dark Tranquility have performed during the pro-shows of the fest. In each edition of Pearl since 2010, the organizing body has based the events and shows of the fest on a theme. The themes of the editions so far are:

Pearl 2020, which was scheduled to be conducted from March 20 to 22, was cancelled amid the COVID-19 pandemic that was threatening the people all over the world.

Events 

All the cultural clubs of BITS-Pilani Hyderabad Campus, organize online and offline competitions in the weeks leading up to and during Pearl. The nature of events and the clubs organizing them are following:
  Art (Shades Club)
  Dance (Dance Club)
  Design (Designers Anonymous)
  Dramatics (Dramatics Club)
  Hindi literary (Tarang)
  Journalistic (Journal Club)
  Literary (English Language Activities' Society)
  Music (Music Club)
  Photography (Photog Club)
  Quizzing (Quiz Club)
  Vfx (VFx Club)
  Foreign languages (Sanskrit and Foreign Language Association)
  Cooking (Cooking Club)
 Fashion (fashion society)

Each of the above clubs organizes multiple competitions in their domain. Popular among them include Till Deaf Do We Part (Music), Terpsicore (Dance), Abhivyaktha (Indian Classical Dance), Soul'O (solo dance) Photog Fest (Photography), Sherlocked (English), and Q: Quiz Fest (Quizzing). The Photg Fest also includes an exhibition of as many as 500 photographs taken by the members of the club during the fest. Many of these competitions have regional rounds in metropolitan cities including Kolkota, Sikkim, Mumbai, Bengaluru, Chennai, and Delhi. The winners of these regional rounds compete during Pearl for the final prize. The fest organizing body also organizes Culinary Factory (food festival), Glitterati (fashion show), Catharsis (film festival), Crimson Curtain (dramatics competitions) and Miss Diva (beauty pageant contest). Apart from the above, informal events like Bollywood quiz, Treasure Hunt, and Crossword are also conducted. The total prize money of the events during Pearl is usually about Rs.15 laksh.

Aspire Talks 
Apart from the events, the Centre for Entrepruniaural Leadership (CEL) and the BITS Embryo of the BITS-Pilani Hyderabad organize the Aspire Talks, wherein people of various walks of life who have distinguished themselves in their professions interact with students and share their life stories.

Pro-Shows and Celebrities 

Pearl has hosted many celebrities of vernacular, national and international renown over years since its inception. Each of the three days of the festival ends with a performance by a celebrity performer or band. The people/bands that performed during Pearl are Farhan Akhtar, Vishal–Shekhar, Grammy-winning Wolfmother, Dark Tranquility (the Swedish metal band), Xandria (the German metal band), Thaikkudam Bridge (Indian rock band), Strings, Bharat Jain, Javed Ali, Benny Dayal, Thurisaz (the Belgian metal band), Parikrama, Ganesh and Kumaresh, Karthik, DJ Nucleya, Amplifier (band) (British psychedelic prog rock band), Kryptos (band), the Ghatam Brothers, and the Indian JAM Project.

Apart from pro-shows, Pearl also hosted celebrities promoting films. Pearl 2015 hosted Varun Dhawan and Yami Gautam for the promotion of film Badlapur. The winner of MasterChef India, Pankaj Bhadouria attended the food festival during Pearl 2016. Telugu actors Nani and Vijay Deverakonda visited the campus during Pearl 2015 for the promotion of their film Yevade Subramanyam. Comedian Abish Matthew performed during the comedy night of Peal 2016.

See also
 BITS Pilani Hyderabad Campus
 ATMOS -Technical Fest of BITS-Pilani Hyderabad
 Verba Maximus - Literary Fest of BITS-Pilani Hyderabad

External links
 
 Pearl 2016, BITS – Pilani Hyderabad is all set to go! Are you ready?

References

2009 establishments in Andhra Pradesh
Culfests
Festivals in Hyderabad, India
Birla Institute of Technology and Science, Pilani – Hyderabad Campus
Recurring events established in 2009